The Faroe Islands women's national football team represents the Faroe Islands in women's association football and is controlled by the Faroe Islands Football Association (FSF), the governing body of all football in the Faroe Islands. The FSF became a member of the International Federation of Association Football (FIFA) in 1988 and Union of European Football Associations (UEFA) in 1990. By population, it remains the fourth smallest member of UEFA, which encompasses the countries of Europe. The women's team played their first FIFA-sanctioned international match in 1995 and have never advanced to the finals of the FIFA Women's World Cup or UEFA Women's Championship. They took part in the Island Games in 2001, 2003 and 2005 and won all three tournaments, as well as appearing at the 2010 edition of the Algarve Cup. In the Faroe Islands, the team is known as the Kvinnulandsliðið.

History

The FSF was founded on 13 January 1979 and a women's national league began play in 1985. The first Faroese women's national team games took place in June 1986, with two defeats to Iceland. The matches, a 6–0 defeat at Kópavogsvöllur and a 2–0 defeat at Akranesvöllur, predate the Faroe Islands' membership of FIFA and UEFA but are listed as full internationals at both FIFA.com and the official website of the Football Association of Iceland (KSÍ).

The Faroe Islands joined FIFA on 2 July 1988 and the male national team played its first official match—a 1–0 defeat against Iceland—on 24 August 1988. Membership of UEFA followed on 18 April 1990 and the Faroe Islands' male team entered its first major international competition later that year: the qualifying rounds for the 1992 UEFA European Football Championship.

A women's team was formed to take part in the 1997 UEFA Women's Championship qualification tournament, which began in September 1995. Páll Guðlaugsson was appointed as coach. The Faroe Islands were competing at class B, in a regionalised group alongside Belgium, Ireland, Scotland and Wales. The group winners would not qualify for the final tournament but would play-off against a last placed team from A class for promotion to the higher grade.

The Faroe Islands staged all their home games at the national stadium of the time, Svangaskarð in Toftir. On 24 September 1995 they lost their first ever home match 2–0 to Ireland. The following month, another 2–0 defeat, to Belgium in Brussels, preceded a 7–1 loss in Scotland where Sólvá Joensen scored the team's first ever goal. Two days later, on 25 October 1995, the Faroe Islands beat Wales 1–0 at Farrar Road in Bangor to record their first ever victory. Helga Ellingsgaard scored the decisive goal on 35 minutes, while opposition coach Sue Lopez lamented her team's failure to convert any of their 20 shots at goal.

The next match was a 3–1 defeat in Dublin, Ireland's third goal coming in the last minute. In 1996 the Faroe Islands finished their campaign with three home games, but lost them all. The first, on 18 May 1996, was a 9–0 defeat by group winners Belgium which remained the Faroe Islands' joint record defeat until 2019. Scotland and Wales departed Toftir with 3–0 and 1–0 victories, respectively, as the Faroe Islands finished bottom of the group with three points, having scored three goals and conceded 27.

The FSF scrapped their women's national team after the tournament, as they were unwilling to fund travel to away fixtures. They did enter competitions at youth level, which were not played on a home and away basis but were mini-tournaments staged in a single location to keep costs down.

When the senior women's national team was relaunched in 2004 after an eight-year hiatus, their first match was a 2–1 friendly defeat to Ireland. Irish coach Noel King named an experimental team which lacked his leading players from Arsenal Ladies. The game was staged in Klaksvík on 12 October 2004, the day before the nations' senior men's teams met at Lansdowne Road, Dublin.

In the next match, a return friendly with Ireland at the Oscar Traynor Centre in Dublin, Rannvá B. Andreasen put the Faroe Islands ahead after six minutes. Ireland hit back to win 2–1.

The Faroe Islands' first matches back in UEFA competition came in November 2006, at the UEFA Women's Euro 2009 qualifying series. At a preliminary round mini-tournament held in Strumica, Macedonia, Malena Josephsen's injury time goal in the first match was not enough to avert a 2–1 defeat to Wales. The team was eliminated after another defeat, 1–0 to Kazakhstan. In the final match the Faroe Islands beat hosts Macedonia 7–0 at Stadion Kukuš to record a record win which stood until 2015.

Team image

Home stadium
The Faroe Islands women's national football team plays their home matches on the Tórsvøllur.

Results and fixtures

 The following is a list of match results in the last 12 months, as well as any future matches that have been scheduled.

Legend

2022

2023

Coaching staff

Current coaching staff

Manager history

  Páll Guðlaugsson (1995–1997)
  Álvur Hansen (2001– May 2012)
  Rúni Nolsøe 2012
  Jón Pauli Olsen (2013–2015)
  Pætur Clementsen (December 2015 – 2018)
  John Petersen (2019–2020)
  Lene Terp (January 2021–)

Players

Current squad
 The following players were named for the match against Hungary on 26 October 2021.
 Caps and goals updated as of 24 October 2020, after the match against Wales.

Recent call ups
 The following players have been called up to a Faroe Islands squad in the past 12 months.

Former players
Katrina Akursmørk (2011–2014, 2017– )

Records

Individual records

Source:
Players in bold are still active.

Most capped players

Top goalscorers

Team records
On 28 November 2012 two of the players of the Faroe Islands women's national team set a world record. For the first time ever a parent and child played together in a football match for their country. Bára Skaale Klakkstein has played for many years now on the national team, Eyðvør has played for the U17 and U19 national teams, but on 28 November 2012 both mother and daughter played together in a friendly match against Luxembourg. The Faroe Islands won 6–0. Eyðvør was born on 5 September 1995 and was 17 years old when playing this match which was her first for the national team. The mother, Bára Skaale Klakkstein, was born on 24 March 1973 and was 39 years old, when she played the match against Luxembourg. Mother and daughter have played together on the KÍ women's best team since 2010.

Honours
Island Games
 Champions: 2001, 2003, 2005

Women's Baltic Cup
 Champions: 2016
 Runners-up: 2021

Competitive record

FIFA Women's World Cup

*Draws include knockout matches decided on penalty kicks.

UEFA Women's Championship

*Draws include knockout matches decided on penalty kicks.

Island Games

See also

Sport in Faroe Islands
Football in Faroe Islands
Women's football in Faroe Islands
Faroe Islands women's national under-20 football team
Faroe Islands women's national under-17 football team
Faroe Islands men's national football team

References

Bibliography

External links
Official website
FIFA profile

 
European women's national association football teams
Women's football in the Faroe Islands
1986 establishments in Denmark